TAFI or Tafi may refer to:

Carboxypeptidase B2
Andrea Tafi (cyclist)
Andrea Tafi (artist)
Tafí del Valle
Tafí Viejo Department
Tafí del Valle Department
Darreh-ye Tafi, Saqqez
Tafí Viejo, Tucumán
Nyangbo-Tafi language

See also
Tafi (disambiguation)